Yume Takikawa (born 31 August 1999) is a Japanese professional footballer who plays as a midfielder for WE League club Albirex Niigata Ladies.

Club career 
Takikawa made her WE League debut on 12 September 2021.

References 

Living people
1999 births
Women's association football midfielders
WE League players
Japanese women's footballers
Association football people from Mie Prefecture
Albirex Niigata Ladies players